Kilmarnock Corporation Tramways operated a tramway service in Kilmarnock between 1904 and 1926.

History

To power the tramway an electric power station was built on the south bank of the River Irvine at Riccarton. 

The tram network at its peak went from Ayr Road in Riccarton at its southerly point, to Knockinlaw Road in Beansburn in the north. At Kilmarnock Cross, the line had an easterly spur that stretched along London Road, through Crookedholm and finally terminating at Hurlford. 

The depot was located in Greenholm Street (grid reference ).

Proposed extensions along Portland Road, up John Finnie Street, West Langlands Street and towards Crosshouse, were never constructed.

Closure

The trams ceased operation during the UK General Strike of 1926. The council decided not to restart the service and the infrastructure was soon dismantled.

References

External links

 Kilmarnock Corporation Tramways at British Tramway Company Badges and Buttons

Tram transport in Scotland
Transport companies established in 1904
Transport companies disestablished in 1926
1904 establishments in Scotland
1926 disestablishments in Scotland
British companies disestablished in 1926
British companies established in 1904